The Esino is a river in the Marche region of central Italy.

Geography
The source of the river is east of Monte Penna in the province of Macerata near the border with the province of Ancona. The river flows east past Esanatoglia and curves north by Matelica before crossing the border into the province of Ancona near Cerreto d'Esi. The river continues flowing north before curving northeast near Genga. It then flows northeast near Serra San Quirico, Maiolati Spontini, Castelplanio, Castelbellino, Jesi, Chiaravalle and Montemarciano before flowing into the Adriatic Sea near Falconara Marittima.

Esino DOC
Since 1995, the area around the Esino has been permitted to produce red and white Italian DOC wines. Grapes are limited to a harvest yield of 12 tonnes/ha with the finished wines requiring a minimum alcohol level of 10.5%. Reds are a minimum 60% of Montepulciano and/or Sangiovese with other local grape varieties permitted to fill out of the rest. Whites are predominantly composed of Verdicchio (50-100%) with other local varieties permitted to fill out the rest.

See also
List of Italian DOC wines

References

Rivers of the Province of Macerata
Rivers of the Province of Ancona
Rivers of Italy
Adriatic Italian coast basins